Wedding Management Software or Wedding Planning Software is a term covering software related to wedding planning, management and organization. Most such software include modules for estimation and planning, scheduling, book keeping management, task allocation, wedding website, guest management, invites including RSVPs, vendor management, task reminders via emails and SMS, image and video galleries, directions to venues, and multiple template options.

Many describe wedding management as an offshoot of Project management, which is why many wedding management software look and feel similar to Project management software or ERP systems.

Some companies offer software in two versions – one for individuals and families who are planning a personal wedding or event or wedding planners who may be organizing large and multiple weddings.

See also
 Event management

References

Wedding industry